Yuliya Karol (born 26 June 1991) is a Belarusian middle-distance runner. She competed at the 2016 Summer Olympics in the women's 800 metres; her time of 2:01.09 in the heats did not qualify her for the semifinals.

References

1991 births
Living people
Belarusian female middle-distance runners
Olympic athletes of Belarus
Athletes (track and field) at the 2016 Summer Olympics